Elsa Beata Bunge, née Wrede (18 April 1734 – 19 January 1819), was a Swedish botanist, writer and noble.

Biography
Elsa Beata was born 18 April 1734. She was the daughter of statesman and noble, baron Fabian Wrede, and Katarina Charlotta Sparre. In 1761, she married the statesman Count Sven Bunge. She was an enthusiastic amateur botanist and had large greenhouses set up at her manor Beateberga; the name of the estate means "The Mountain of Beata". Bunge was connected to the Royal Swedish Academy of Sciences and corresponded with Carl von Linné. Her spouse was a member of the academy, and from 1780 forward, she corresponded with the academy, discussed scientific botanical experiments and reported results.

She became well known as a botanist and wrote the botanical work Om vinrankors beskaffenhet efter sjelfva naturens anvisningar (English: "About the nature of vine grapes by direction from nature itself") with tables (1806), the work for which she was recognised as a botanist.

As a person, Countess Bunge aroused attention because of her way of dressing as a man, with the exception of a skirt. A lot of stories and anectodets are told about her. During the reign of Gustav III (1771–1792), the monarch noticed a peculiarly dressed woman in the Royal Swedish Opera and enquired who she was. Bunge replied "Tell His Majesty that I am the daughter of statesman Fabian Wrede and married to statesman Sven Bunge."

Bunge participated in the custom in the mid 18th-century of criticizing people by anonymous poems: she is believed to have been the author of the satirical libel work Kom kära Armod lät oss vandra (Come, dear Poverty, let us go) toward the notoriously stingy chamberlain Conrad Lohe.

Died 
Bunge died on Beateberga manor in Röö Parish in 1819.

Work 
 Om vinrankors beskaffenhet efter sjelfva naturens anvisningar (1806)

See also 
 Eva Ekeblad
 Maria Christina Bruhn

References

Sources
 Sten Lindroth (Swedish): Kungl. Svenska vetenskapsakademiens historia 1739-1818: Tiden intill Wargentins död 1783
 Svenska Linné-sällskapet, Volym 2006 (Swedish)
 Samlaren / Femtonde årgången. 1894 /

Further reading 
 

1734 births
1819 deaths
18th-century Swedish botanists
18th-century Swedish women scientists
19th-century Swedish botanists
19th-century Swedish women scientists
Age of Liberty people
Swedish countesses
Swedish agronomists
Women agronomists
Swedish women botanists